XHESJC-FM is a radio station on 93.1 FM in San José del Cabo, Baja California Sur.

History
XESJC-AM 660 received its concession on May 8, 1995. It was authorized to move to FM in February 2011.

References

Radio stations in Baja California Sur
Radio stations established in 1995
Radio stations in Mexico with continuity obligations